The smooth-scaled mountain lizard (Cristidorsa planidorsata) is an agamid lizard found in Myanmar and northeast India.

References

 Mathew, R. 2004. On an abnormal specimen of Calotes emma and notes on Japalura planidorsata. Hamadryad 28 (1&2): 127.

Cristidorsa
Reptiles of India
Reptiles of Myanmar
Taxa named by Thomas C. Jerdon
Reptiles described in 1870